James Darley Denton (fourth ¼ 1900 – third ¼ 1979) was an English professional rugby league footballer who played in the 1920s and 1930s, and cricketer.

Background
Jim Denton was born in Thornes, Wakefield, West Riding of Yorkshire, England, his birth was registered in Wakefield district, and his death aged 78–79 was registered in Pontefract district, West Yorkshire, England.

Playing career

International honours
Jim Denton played for "The Whites" in "The Reds versus The Whites" 1924 Great Britain Lions tour trial match, but ultimately he was not selected for the tour.

County honours
Jim Denton won caps for Yorkshire while at Featherstone Rovers; during the 1924–25 season against Lancashire, during the 1925–26 season against Cumberland, and Lancashire, and during the 1926–27 season against Cumberland.

County Cup Final appearances
Jim Denton played  in Featherstone Rovers' 0-5 defeat by Leeds in the 1928 Yorkshire County Cup Final during the 1928–29 season at Belle Vue, Wakefield on Saturday 24 November 1928.

Club career

Honoured at Featherstone Rovers
Jim Denton is a Featherstone Rovers Hall of Fame Inductee.

Genealogical information
Jim Denton was the younger brother of the rugby league / for Featherstone Rovers (Heritage № 4); Sid Denton (6 September 1899 – third ¼ 1978 (aged 78–79)).

References

External links
Search for "Denton" at rugbyleagueproject.org
Jim Denton at marklaspalmas.blogspot.com
 Jim Denton and Sid Denton at marklaspalmas.blogspot.com
Search for "Jim Denton" at britishnewspaperarchive.co.uk

1900 births
1979 deaths
English rugby league players
Featherstone Rovers players
Place of death missing
Rugby league centres
Rugby league five-eighths
Rugby league players from Wakefield
Yorkshire rugby league team players